Ban Pao is a tambon (subdistrict) of Mueang Lampang District, in Lampang Province, Thailand. In 2021 it had a total population of 6,650 people.

Administration

Central administration
The tambon is subdivided into 12 administrative villages (muban).

Local administration
The whole area of the subdistrict is covered by the subdistrict administrative organization (SAO) Ban Pao (องค์การบริหารส่วนตำบลบ้านเป้า).

References

External links
Thaitambon.com on Ban Pao

Tambon of Lampang province
Populated places in Lampang province